Didier Vital Poissant (30 September 1923 – 27 February 2021) was a French sailor who competed in the 1956 Summer Olympics, and won the Snipe European Championship in 1954. He died in February 2021 at the age of 97.

References

External links
 
 
 

1923 births
2021 deaths
French male sailors (sport)
Olympic sailors of France
Sailors at the 1956 Summer Olympics – Finn
Snipe class sailors
Sportspeople from Bordeaux